Zhou Yang or Chou Yang (November 7, 1908 – July 31, 1989), courtesy name Qiying (起应), was a Chinese literary theorist, translator and Marxist thinker, active from the founding of the League of the Left-Wing Writers in 1930. In the 1930s he was notable for his sharp disagreements with other leftist writers, including Lu Xun, concerning leftist literary theory.

After the People's Republic of China was declared in 1949, Zhou became one of Mao Zedong's most-supported literary theorists. His report, On the Military Tasks of Philosophy and Social Science Workers, delivered to Mao in 1963, was one of the catalysts for the Cultural Revolution. However, during the late stage of the Cultural Revolution Zhou was himself imprisoned after falling out of favor. After the Cultural Revolution ended, he was rehabilitated and given new political offices. At that time he apologized to victims of his literary witch-hunt campaigns in the past. He also advocated the humanist aspects of Marxism within the Communist Party near the end of his life, and was attacked again for such views.

Zhou also translated the works of Leo Tolstoy and other Russian writers into Chinese.

References

Chinese literary critics
1908 births
1989 deaths
Chinese communists
Marxist theorists
20th-century Chinese historians
Members of the Standing Committee of the 1st Chinese People's Political Consultative Conference